Pedro Martínez defeated Sebastián Báez in the final, 4–6, 6–4, 6–4 to win the singles title at the 2022 Chile Open. It was his first ATP Tour title.

Cristian Garín was the defending champion, but lost in the second round to Alejandro Tabilo.

Seeds
The top four seeds received a bye into the second round.

Draw

Finals

Top half

Bottom half

Qualifying

Seeds

Qualifiers

Lucky loser

Qualifying draw

First qualifier

Second qualifier

Third qualifier

Fourth qualifier

References

External links
Main draw
Qualifying draw

Chile Open - Singles
2022 Singles